The pterygoid fovea (occasionally called the pterygoid pit or the pterygoid depression) is located on the mandible. It is a concave surface on the medial side of the neck of the condyloid process of the mandible. It is located posterior to the mandibular notch and inferior to the mandibular condyle. The pterygoid fovea is the site of insertion for the inferior head of the lateral pterygoid muscle.

References 

Bones of the head and neck